Tony Tun Tun  (born Juan Castro; March 4, 1977) is a Puerto Rican singer, songwriter and record producer. He first became involved in music while attending Carolina's Escuela Libre de Musica, where he played with a local philharmonic orchestra. He joined Victor Roque and La Gran Manzana. After participating in Grupomania, Tony Tun Tun began composing for the merengue.

He debuted as a solo artist with the release of Caminando, singing its title song. In 2001, Juan Castro returned with Con la Música Por Dentro and "Afrodisiaco" in 2004. He has made guest appearances in reggaeton hits' "Mayor Que Yo" (2005) and "Noche de Entierro - Nuestro Amor se acabo" (2006).

Awards

References

1977 births
Living people
People from Carolina, Puerto Rico
Merengue musicians
21st-century Puerto Rican male singers